The 2011–12 Iraqi Elite League (known as the Asiacell Elite League for sponsorship reasons) was the 38th season of the competition since its establishment in 1974. The season began on 29 October 2011 and ended on 20 August 2012. It was played in a home-and-away round-robin format for the first time since the 2002–03 season.

Erbil won their fourth league title, earning 83 points from 38 games and losing just one match. Duhok finished as runners-up with Al-Quwa Al-Jawiya in third place.

League table

Results

Season statistics

Top scorers

Hat-tricks

Notes
4 Player scored 4 goals

References

External links
 Iraq Football Association

Iraqi Premier League seasons
1
Iraq